Venant Bacinoni (20 February 1940 – 23 July 2022) was a Burundian Roman Catholic prelate. He was bishop of Bururi from 2007 to 2020.

References

1940 births
2022 deaths
Roman Catholic bishops of Bururi
Pontifical Gregorian University alumni